Haddebyer Noor is a lake – formerly a small arm of the Schlei inlet of the Baltic Sea – in Schleswig-Holstein, Germany.

Lakes of Schleswig-Holstein